An eponymous adjective is an adjective which has been derived from the name of a person, real or fictional.  Persons from whose name the adjectives have been derived are called eponyms.

Following is a list of eponymous adjectives in English.

A–C
Aaronic – Aaron (as in Aaronic Priesthood)
Abbasid – Abbas ibn Abd al-Muttalib (as in Abbasid Dynasty)
abelian – Niels Henrik Abel (as in Abelian group)
Abrahamic – Abraham (as in Abrahamic religions)
Adamic – Adam (as in Adamic language); also Adamite (as in pre-Adamite race)
Addisonian – Thomas Addison (as in Addisonian crisis)
Adlerian – Alfred Adler (as in Classical Adlerian psychology)
Aegean – Aegeus, of Greek mythology (as in Aegean Sea)
Aeolian – Aeolus, of Greek mythology (as in Aeolian Islands); also Eolian (as in Eolian processes)
Aeschylean – Aeschylus (as in Aeschylean silence)
Aesopian – Aesop the Ancient Greek fabulist. (Also, conveying an innocent meaning to an outsider but a hidden meaning to a member of a conspiracy or underground movement.)
Ahmadiyya – Ahmad (as in Ahmadiyya)
Aldine – Aldus Manutius (as in Aldine Press)
Alexandrine – Alexander the Great (as in Alexandrine verse); also Alexandrian (as in Alexandrian period)
American – Amerigo Vespucci
Amish – Jakob Ammann
Ampèrian – André-Marie Ampère (as in Ampèrian loop)
Anacreontic – Anacreon
Andrean – Andrew the Apostle (as in Andrean High School)
Antonian –  St. Anthony the Great (as in Antonian monasticism); Antoninus Pius (as in Nervan-Antonian dynasty)
Antonine – Antoninus Pius (as in Antonine Wall); Marcus Aurelius Antoninus (as in Antonine Plague)
Apollonian – Apollo, of Greek mythology (as in Apollonian Oracle); Apollonius of Perga (as in Apollonian gasket)
Archimedean – Archimedes (as in Archimedean screw)
Arian – Arius
Aristotelian – Aristotle (as in Aristotelian logic)
Arminian – Jacobus Arminius
Arsacid – Arsaces I of Parthia (as in Arsacid Dynasty)
Arthurian – King Arthur (as in Arthurian legend)
Artinian – Emil Artin (as in Artinian ring)
Ashmolean – Elias Ashmole (as in Ashmolean Museum)
Asimovian – Isaac Asimov (as in Asimovian robot)
Athanasian – St. Athanasius (as in Athanasian Creed)
Athenian – Athena, of Greek mythology
Atlantean – Atlas; also Atlantic
Augustan – Caesar Augustus (as in Augustan drama)
Augustinian – St. Augustine (as in Augustinian Order)
bacchanal – Bacchus, of Roman mythology; also "bacchanalian"
Bachian – Johann Sebastian Bach
Baconian – Francis Bacon (as in Baconian cipher)
Baháʼí – Bahá'u'lláh (as in Baháʼí Faith)
 Bakerian – Henry Baker (as in Bakerian Lecture)
Bakhtinian – Mikhail Bakhtin
Ballardian – J. G. Ballard
Bangsian – John Kendrick Bangs (as in Bangsian fantasy)
Barthesian – Roland Barthes
Batesian – Henry Walter Bates (as in Batesian mimicry)
Bayesian – Thomas Bayes (as in Bayesian probability)
Beethovenian – Ludwig van Beethoven
Benedictine – Benedict of Nursia (as in Benedictine Rule)
Benthamite – Jeremy Bentham (as in Benthamite Utilitarianism)
Berkeleyan  – George Berkeley (as in Berkeleyan idealism)
Blairite – Tony Blair
Bodleian – Thomas Bodley (as in Bodleian Library)
Bohmian – David Bohm (as in Bohmian mechanics)
Bolivarian – Simón Bolívar (as in Bolivarian Revolution)
Boolean – George Boole (as in Boolean algebra, Boolean logic)
Bradmanesque – Donald Bradman
Brahmsian – Johannes Brahms
Brechtian – Bertolt Brecht (as in Brechtian acting)
Brownian – Robert Brown (as in Brownian motion)
Brunonian – John Brown, the doctor (as in Brunonian system of medicine)
Buddhist – Gautama Buddha (as in Buddhist rosary)
Burkean – Edmund Burke (as in Burkean conservatism)
Byronic – Lord Byron (as in Byronic hero)
Caesarean – often incorrectly attributed to Julius Caesar (as in Caesarean section)
Calvinist – John Calvin (as in Calvinist Church)
Capetian – Hugh Capet (as in Capetian Dynasty, Direct Capetians)
Capraesque – Frank Capra
Carolean – Charles II of England (as in Carolean style)
Caroline – Charles I of England (as in Caroline era); also Carolinian
Carolingian – Charlemagne (as in Carolingian dynasty)
Carrollian – Lewis Carroll, pseudonym of Charles Lutwidge Dodgson
Carterian – James Carter (as in In Carterian Fashion)
Cartesian – René Descartes (as in Cartesian coordinate)
Catilinarian – Catiline (as in Catilinarian conspiracy) 
Chandleresque – Raymond Chandler
Chaucerian  – Geoffrey Chaucer (as in Chaucerian stanza)
chauvinistic – Nicolas Chauvin
Chekhovian –  Anton Chekhov
Chestertonian – G. K. Chesterton
Chomskyan – Noam Chomsky; also Chomskian
Chopinesque – Frédéric Chopin
Chretienite - Jean Chrétien
Christian – Jesus Christ
Churchillian – Winston Churchill
Churrigueresque – José Benito de Churriguera
Ciceronian – Cicero
Claudian – Claudius (as in Julio-Claudian dynasty)
Clintonian – Bill Clinton
Columbian – Christopher Columbus (as in Columbian Exchange)
Confucianist – Confucius
Constantinian – Constantine I (as in Constantinian dynasty)
Coolidgean – Calvin Coolidge
Copernican – Nicolaus Copernicus (as in Copernican heliocentrism)
Cronenbergian – David Cronenberg
Cromwellian – Oliver Cromwell
Croonian – William Croone (as in Croonian Lecture)
Cushingoid – Harvey Cushing – American physician
Cyrillic – St. Cyril (as in Cyrillic)

D–F
daedal – Daedalus, of Greek mythology; also Daedalic and Daedalian or Daedalean
Daliesque – Salvador Dalí
Daltonian – John Dalton
Dantesque – Dante Alighieri; also Dantean
Darwinian – Charles Darwin (as in Darwinian literary studies)
Davidic – David (as in Davidic line)
Deleuzian – Gilles Deleuze
Dengist – Deng Xiaoping
Derridean – Jacques Derrida (as in Derridean deconstruction)
Dickensian – Charles Dickens
Dickinsonian – Emily Dickinson
Diogenean – Diogenes of Sinope
Dionysian – Dionysus, of Greek mythology (as in Dionysian Mysteries); Dionysius Exiguus (as in Dionysian era)
Diophantine – Diophantus (as in Diophantine equation)
Dobsonian – John Dobson (as in Dobsonian telescope)
Dominican – Saint Dominic (as in Dominican Order)
Dostoevskian – Fyodor Dostoevsky; also Dostoyevskian
draconian – Draco
Dulcinian – Fra Dolcino
dylanesque – Bob Dylan
Edisonian – Thomas Edison (as in Edisonian approach)
Edwardian – King Edward VII
Edwardine – Edward VI, (as in Edwardine Ordinal) 
Edwardsian – Jonathan Edwards
Einsteinian – Albert Einstein
Eliotic – T. S. Eliot
Elizabethan – Queen Elizabeth I (as in Elizabethan era)
Emersonian – Ralph Waldo Emerson (as in Emersonian perfectionism)
Enochian – Enoch (as in Enochian magic)
epicurean – Epicurus
Erasmian – Erasmus (as in Erasmian Reformation)
erotic – Eros, of Greek mythology
Euclidean – Euclid (as in Euclidean geometry, Euclidean algorithm)
Eulerian – Euler (as in Eulerian path)
Euripidean – Euripides
Eustachian – Eustachius (as in Eustachian tube)
Everettian – Hugh Everett III (as in Everettian quantum theory)
Fabian – Quintus Fabius Maximus Verrucosus (as in Fabian strategy)
Fallopian – Gabriele Falloppio (as in Fallopian tube)
Falstaffian – Sir John Falstaff, Shakespeare's fictional character
Faradic – Michael Faraday
Fatimid – Fatima as-Zahra (as in Fatimid caliphate)
Faulknerian – William Faulkner
Faustian – Faust, Goethe's fictional character (as in Faustian deal)
Felliniesque – Federico Fellini
Flavian – Titus Flavius Vespasianus (Vespasian) (as in Flavian dynasty)
Fordian – Henry Ford (as in Society for the Propagation of Fordian Knowledge); also Fordist
Fortean – Charles Fort (as in Fortean Society)
Foucauldian – Michel Foucault (as in Foucauldian discourse analysis)
Franciscan – St. Francis of Assisi (as in Franciscan Order)
Franklinic – Benjamin Franklin (as in Franklinic electricity, franklinic taste)
Frederician – Frederick the Great (as in Frederician Rococo)
Freirean – Paulo Freire (as in Freirean pedagogy)
Freudian – Sigmund Freud (as in Freudian slip)
Frostian – Robert Frost
Fullerian – John 'Mad Jack' Fuller (as in Fullerian Professor of Chemistry)
Fuxian – Johann Joseph Fux (as in Fuxian Counterpoint)

G–J
Galilean – Galileo Galilei (as in Galilean moons)
Galvanic – Luigi Galvani (as in Galvanic cell)
Gandhian – Mahatma Gandhi (as in Gandhian economics)
gargantuan – Gargantua, Rabelais's fictional character
Gaullist – Charles de Gaulle
Gaussian – Carl Friedrich Gauss (as in Gaussian function)
Genghisid – Genghis Khan 
Georgian –  any of the first 4 Hanoverian kings of England (all named George)
Georgist – Henry George (as in Georgism)
Gilliamesque – Terry Gilliam (similar to Kafkaesque and Pythonesque, said of films, animations, and scenarios)
Gladstonian – William Ewart Gladstone (as in Gladstonian Liberalism)
Gödelian – Kurt Gödel (as in Gödelian incompleteness)
Goulstonian – Theodore Goulston (as in Goulstonian Lecture)
Gregorian – Pope Gregory I (as in Gregorian chant); Pope Gregory XIII (as in Gregorian calendar)
Gricean – Paul Grice (as in Gricean maxims)
Grundtvigian – N. F. S. Grundtvig (as in Grundtvigian Lutheranism)
Hadrianic – Roman emperor Hadrian
Handelian – George Frideric Handel
Hamiltonian – Sir William Rowan Hamilton (as in Hamiltonian path); Alexander Hamilton (as in Hamiltonian economic program)
Hamitic – Ham (as in Hamitic languages)
Harperite - Stephen Harper
Harveian – William Harvey (as in Harveian Oration)
Haydnesque – Joseph Haydn
Hayekian – Friedrich Hayek (as in Hayekian triangle)
Hegelian – Georg Wilhelm Friedrich Hegel (as in Hegelian dialectic)
Henrician – King Henry VIII (as in Henrician Reformation); Henry III of France (as in Henrician Articles)
herculean – Hercules, of Greek mythology (as in herculean task)
hermaphroditic – Hermaphroditus, of Greek mythology
hermetic – Hermes Trismegistus, a mythological alchemist (as in hermetic seal)
Hermitian – Charles Hermite (as in Hermitian matrix)
Herodian – Herod the Great (as in Herodian Dynasty)
Heronian – Hero of Alexandria (as in Heronian triangle)
Hilbertian – David Hilbert (as in Hilbertian field)
Hippocratic – Hippocrates (as in Hippocratic Oath)
Hitchcockian – Alfred Hitchcock
Hitlerian – Adolf Hitler
Hobbesian – Thomas Hobbes
Holmesian – Sherlock Holmes, Conan Doyle's fictional character; also Sherlockian
Homeric – Homer
Horatian – Horace (as in Horatian satire)
Humean – David Hume
Hunterian – William Hunter (anatomist) (as in Hunterian Museum)
Hussite – Jan Hus (as in Hussite Wars)
Hutterite – Jacob Hutter
Ignatian – Ignatius of Loyola (as in Ignatian spirituality)
Imeldific – Imelda Marcos (meaning ostentatious; extravagant)
Irenic – Eirene (of Greek mythology; meaning peaceable)
Jacksonian – Andrew Jackson (as in Jacksonian democracy); John Hughlings Jackson (as in Jacksonian seizure)
Jacobean – King James I (as in Jacobean era)
Jacobian – Carl Gustav Jacobi (as in Jacobian matrix)
Jacobite – King James II (as in Jacobitism)
Jagiellonian – Władysław II Jagiełło (as in Jagiellonian dynasty)
Japhetic – Japheth (as in Japhetic theory)
Jeffersonian – Thomas Jefferson (as in Jeffersonian democracy)
Johannine – Saint John the Evangelist (as in Johannine literature)
Johnsonian – Samuel Johnson
Jordanesque – Michael Jordan (usually denotes remarkable athletic achievement or dominance)
Josephite – Saint Joseph (as in Josephite Marriage or Josephite Fathers) 
jovial – Jove/Jupiter, of Roman mythology; also Jovian
Joycean – James Joyce (as in Pre-Joycean Fellowship)
Julian – Julius Caesar (as in Julian calendar)
Jungian – Carl Jung (as in Jungian psychology)
Junoesque – Juno, of Roman mythology
Justinianic – Justinian I
Juvenalian – Juvenal (as in Juvenalian satire)

K–M
Kafkaesque – Franz Kafka
Kantian – Immanuel Kant
Keatsian – John Keats
 Kemalist – Kemal Atatürk
Kennedyesque – John F. Kennedy
Keynesian – John Maynard Keynes (as in Keynesian economics)
Kierkegaardian – Søren Kierkegaard
Kirbyesque – Jack Kirby
Kubrickian – Stanley Kubrick
Lacanian – Jacques Lacan (as in Lacanian psychoanalysis)
Lagrangian – Joseph-Louis Lagrange (as in Lagrangian point)
Lamarckian – Jean-Baptiste Lamarck (as in Lamarckian evolution)
Landian – Nick Land 
Laplacian – Pierre-Simon Laplace (as in Laplacian field, Laplacian matrix)
Levitical – Levi (as in Levitical Priesthood)
Leibnizian – Gottfried Leibniz (as in Leibnizian calculus)
Leninist – Vladimir Lenin
Lilian – Aloysius Lilius (as in Lilian date)
Linnaean – Carl Linnaeus (as in Linnaean taxonomy)
Lincolnesque – Abraham Lincoln; also Lincolnian
Lisztian – Franz Liszt
Lockean – John Locke
Lorentzian – Hendrik Lorentz (as in Lorentzian function)
Lovecraftian – H. P. Lovecraft (as in Lovecraftian horror)
Lucan – Saint Luke the Evangelist (as in Lucan Theology) 
Lucasian – Henry Lucas (as in Lucasian Professor)
Luddite – Ned Ludd
Lullian – Ramon Llull (as in Lullian art); also Llullian
Lumleian – John Lumley, 1st Baron Lumley (as in Lumleian Lectures)
Lutheran – Martin Luther
Lynchian – David Lynch
macadamized – John Loudon McAdam (as in macadamized system)
Maccabean – Judas Maccabeus (as in Maccabean revolt)
MacGyverian – Angus MacGyver
Machiavellian – Niccolò Machiavelli 
MacIntyrean – Alasdair MacIntyre (as in MacIntyrean moral tradition)
Madisonian – James Madison (as in Madisonian Model)
Magellanic – Ferdinand Magellan (as in Magellanic Clouds)
Mahlerian – Gustav Mahler
Malpighian – Marcello Malpighi (as in Malpighian corpuscle)
Malthusian – Thomas Malthus (as in Malthusian catastrophe)
Manichaean – Mani
manueline – Manuel I of Portugal
Maoist – Mao Zedong
Marcan – Saint Mark the Evangelist, (as in Marcan Priority)  
Marian – Mary (as in Marian apparition); Gaius Marius (as in Marian reforms)
Marivaudian – Pierre de Marivaux
Markovian – Andrey Markov (as in Markovian process)
Marlenesque – Marlene Dietrich (as in Marlenesque nose)
Marlovian – Christopher Marlowe (as in Marlovian theory)
martial – Mars, of Roman mythology (as in Martial arts)
Martinite - Paul Martin
Marxist – Karl Marx (as in Marxist theory); also Marxian (as in Marxian economics)
Maslowian – Abraham Maslow; also Maslovian
masochistic – Leopold von Sacher-Masoch
Matthean – Saint Matthew the Evangelist, (as in Matthean Exception) 
maudlin – Mary Magdalene
Maxwellian – James Clerk Maxwell (as in Maxwellian distribution, Maxwellian demon)
mazarine – Cardinal Mazarin (as in mazarine blue)
McCarthyist – Joseph McCarthy
Melchizedek – Melchizedek (as in Melchizedek priesthood)
Mendelian – Gregor Mendel (as in Mendelian inheritance)
Mendelssohnian – Felix Mendelssohn
Menippean – Menippus (as in Menippean satire)
Mennonite – Menno Simons
mercurial – Mercury
Merovingian – Merovech (as in Merovingian dynasty)
Metonic – Meton (as in Metonic cycle)
Millian – John Stuart Mill (as in Millian theory of proper names)
Miltonic – John Milton; also Miltonian
Minkowskian – Hermann Minkowski
Mithridatic – Mithridates VI (as in Mithridatic Wars)
Mohammedan – Muhammad (as in Mohammedan art)
Mosaic – Moses (as in Mosaic Law, but not as in mosaic floor)
Mozartean – Wolfgang Mozart

N–Q
Napierian – John Napier (as in Napierian logarithm)
Napoleonic – Napoléon Bonaparte (as in Napoleonic code)
narcissistic – Narcissus, of Greek mythology (as in Narcissistic personality disorder)
Nehruvian – Jawaharlal Nehru
Neronian – Nero
Nervan – Nerva (as in Nervan-Antonian dynasty)
Nestorian – Nestorius (as in Nestorian Schism)
Newtonian – Isaac Newton (as in Newtonian telescope)
Nietzschean – Friedrich Nietzsche (as in Nietzschean affirmation)
Nixonian – Richard Nixon
Noachian – Noah (as in Noachian deluge)
Noetherian – Emmy Noether (as in Noetherian ring)
Norquistian – Grover Norquist
Odinic – Odin
Odyssean – Odysseus
Oedipal – Oedipus, of Greek mythology (as in Oedipal complex)
ohmic – Georg Ohm (as in ohmic device)
onanistic – Onan
 Orbanist  – Victor Orban
Orphic – Orpheus, of Greek mythology (as in Orphic Mysteries)
Orwellian – George Orwell
Osirian – Osiris, of Egyptian mythology
Ottoman – Osman I (as in Ottoman Empire)
Ottonian – Otto I the Great (as in Ottonian Dynasty)
Ovidian – Ovid
Oxfordian – Edward de Vere, 17th Earl of Oxford (as in Oxfordian theory)
Palinian – Michael Palin (as in Palinian wit) 
Palladian – Andrea Palladio (as in Palladian architecture)
Panglossian – Pangloss, Voltaire's fictional character
Paracelsian – Paracelsus
parkinsonian – James Parkinson (as in parkinsonian syndrome)
pasteurized –  Louis Pasteur (as in pasteurized milk) 
Pauline – Paul of Tarsus (as in Pauline epistles)
Pavlovian – Ivan Pavlov (as in Pavlovian conditioning)
Pecksniffian – Seth Pecksniff, Dickens' fictional character
Pelagian – Pelagius (as in Pelagian heresy)
Pepysian – Samuel Pepys
Periclean – Pericles (as in Periclean Athens)
Petrine – Saint Peter (as in Petrine primacy); also Peter the Great (as in Petrine baroque)
Piagetian – Jean Piaget (as in Piagetian theory)
Pickwickian – Samuel Pickwick, Dickens' fictional character
Pigouvian – Arthur Cecil Pigou (as in Pigouvian Tax)
Pinteresque – Harold Pinter
Platonic – Plato (as in Platonic love)
Plinian – Pliny (as in Plinian eruption)
Plutarchian – Plutarch
plutonic – Pluto, of Greek & Roman mythology (as in Plutonic theory); also plutonian
Pollyannish – Pollyanna, fictional character 
Pombaline – Marquis of Pombal (as in Pombaline Downtown)
Popperian – Karl Popper (as in Popperian falsification)
Procrustean – Procrustes, of Greek mythology (as in Pombaline Downtown)
Promethean – Prometheus, of Greek mythology
protean – Proteus, of Greek mythology
Proustian – Marcel Proust (as in Proustian memory)
Ptolemaic – Ptolemy (as in Ptolemaic system); Ptolemy I Soter (as in Ptolemaic dynasty)
Putinist – Vladimir Putin (as in Putinist Russia)
Pyrrhic – Pyrrhus of Epirus (as in Pyrrhic victory)
Pyrrhonian – Pyrrho (as in Pyrrhonian skepticism)
Pythagorean – Pythagoras (as in Pythagorean theorem)
Pythonic – Monty Python, a more correct eponym, used by Terry Jones, for the more commonly used Pythonesque (as in Pythonic sketches)
Pythonesque – Monty Python, fictional character name from television comedy (as in Pythonesque humour)
Quirinal – Quirinus, of Roman mythology (as in Quirinal Hill)
quixotic – Don Quixote, Cervantes' fictional character

R–U
Rabelaisian – François Rabelais
Rachmaninovian – Sergei Rachmaninoff
Randian – Ayn Rand (as in Randian hero)
Raphaelesque – Raphael; also Raphaelite (as in Pre-Raphaelite Brotherhood)
Rastafarian – Ras Tafari (Haile Selassie)
Reaganesque – Ronald Reagan
Reithian – John Reith (as in Reithian principles)
Ricardian – David Ricardo (as in Ricardian economics)
Richardsonian – Henry Hobson Richardson (as in Richardsonian Romanesque)
Riemannian – Bernhard Riemann (as in Riemannian geometry)
ritzy – César Ritz
Rockwellian – Norman Rockwell
Rogerian – Carl Rogers (as in Rogerian therapy)
Rothbardian – Murray N. Rothbard
Rousseauian – Jean-Jacques Rousseau
Rubenesque – Peter Paul Rubens
Rumsfeldian – Donald Rumsfeld
Ruthian – Babe Ruth
sadistic – Marquis de Sade
Sambergian – Andy Samberg
Samsonian – Samson
Sapphic – Sappho (as in Sapphic love)
Sartrean – Jean-Paul Sartre
Sasanian – Sassan (as in Sasanian dynasty); also Sassanian, Sassanid
satanic – Satan (as in Satanic Verses)
Saturnine – Saturn (as in Saturnine temperament)
Schenkerian – Heinrich Schenker as in Schenkerian analysis
Schubertian – Franz Schubert
Seleucid – Seleucus I Nicator (as in Seleucid Empire)
Semitic – Shem (as in Semitic languages)
Senecan – Seneca (as in Senecan Tragedy)
Servian – Servius Tullius (as in Servian Wall)
Severan – Septimius Severus (as in Severan dynasty)
Shakespearean – William Shakespeare (as in Shakespearean authorship, Shakespearean tragedy)
Shavian – George Bernard Shaw (as in Shavian alphabet, Shavian reversal)
Sistine – Pope Sixtus IV (as in Sistine Chapel)
Sisyphean – Sisyphus, of Greek mythology
Skinnerian – B. F. Skinner (as in Skinnerian behaviorism)
Smithsonian – James Smithson (as in Smithsonian Institution)
Socinian – Faustus Socinus
Socratic – Socrates (as in Socratic method)
Solomonic – Solomon (as in Solomonic dynasty)
Solonian – Solon (as in Solonian Constitution)
Sophoclean – Sophocles
Spencerian – Platt Rogers Spencer (as in Spencerian script)
Spenserian – Edmund Spenser (as in Spenserian stanza)
Spielbergian – Steven Spielberg
Spinozist – Baruch Spinoza (as in Spinozism)
 Stalinist – Joseph Stalin (as in Stalinist architecture)
stentorian – Stentor, of Greek mythology
 Swiftian – Jonathan Swift (as in Swiftian satire) or Taylor Swift (as in Swiftian songwriting)
sybaritic – Sybaris
tantalizing – Tantalus
Tennysonian – Alfred, Lord Tennyson
terpsichorean – Terpsichore
Thatcherite – Margaret Thatcher
Theodosian – Count Theodosius (as in Theodosian dynasty)
thespian – Thespis
Thomist – St. Thomas Aquinas (as in Thomist philosophy)
Thomsonian – Dr. Samuel Thomson (as in Thomsonian Medicine)
Thoreauvian – Henry David Thoreau
thrasonical – Thraso, Terence's fictional character
Titchy – Little Tich, stage name of Harry Relph
Titian – Titian (as in titian-coloured)
Timurid – Timur (Tamerlane) (as in Timurid Empire)
Tironian – Marcus Tullius Tiro (as in Tironian notes)
Titanic – Titan (as in Titanic prime)
Tolkienism – J. R. R. Tolkien
Tolstoyan – Leo Tolstoy; also Tolstoian
Torricellian – Evangelista Torricelli (as in Torricellian chamber)
Trotskyist – Leon Trotsky; also Trotskyite
Trudeauvian - Pierre or Justin Trudeau
Trumpian – Donald Trump
Tychonic – Tycho Brahe (as in Tychonic system); also Tychonian
Umayyad – Umayya ibn Abd Shams (as in Umayyad Dynasty)

V–Z
  Vattelian – Emer de Vattel
Vesalian – Vesalius
Vestal – Vesta, of Roman mythology (as in Vestal Virgin)
Victorian – Queen Victoria (as in Victorian era)
Virgilian – Virgil; also Vergilian
Vitruvian – Marcus Vitruvius Pollio (as in Vitruvian Man)
Voltaic – Alessandro Volta (as in Voltaic pile)
Voltairean – Voltaire
Vonnegutian – Kurt Vonnegut, Jr.
Vygotskian – Lev Vygotsky
Wagnerian – Richard Wagner (as in Wagnerian rock)
Waldensian – Peter Waldo (as in Waldensian Church)
Wardian – Nathaniel Bagshaw Ward (as in Wardian Case)
Washingtonian – George Washington; Martha Washington (as in Washingtonian movement)
Wesleyan – John Wesley (as in Wesleyan Church)
Wavian – Evelyn Waugh
Whedonesque – Joss Whedon (popularized by the fan site Whedonesque.com)
Whitlamesque – Gough Whitlam
Wildean – Oscar Wilde
Williamite – King William III (as in Williamite War)
Wilsonian – Woodrow Wilson
Wolffian – Caspar Friedrich Wolff (a Wolffian body, as in Wolffian duct) and Christian Wolff (philosopher)
Woodwardian – John Woodward (as in Woodwardian Professor of Geology)
Wordsworthean – William Wordsworth, (as in Wadsworthean ego)
Wronskian – Josef Hoëné-Wroński (as in Wronskian determinant)
Zoroastrian – Zoroaster (Zarathustra); also Zarathustrian
Zwinglian – Huldrych Zwingli

See also
 List of eponyms

Notes

Eponymous adjectives in English, List of
Adjectives in English